Rattota is a town in Sri Lanka, located within Matale District, Central Province. The population of the town, according to the 2012 census, was 1,761.

Local Government Council
Rattota is governed by the Rattota Pradeshiya Sabha.

Banks
There are two public banks operating in Rattota.

In biology
The two jumping spiders known as Marengo rattotensis and Onomastus rattotensis was discovered from this area, hence specific name.

See also
List of towns in Central Province, Sri Lanka

References

External links

Populated places in Matale District